Naesiotus pilsbryi is a species of tropical air-breathing land snail, a pulmonate gastropod mollusk in the family Bulimulidae. 

The name pilsbryi is in honor of American malacologist Henry Augustus Pilsbry.

Distribution 

 Peru

The type locality is Chagual, 07°50’S 077°38’W, 1275 m, La Libertad Region, Peru. This species is known from the type locality only and may be range-restricted.

References
This article incorporates CC-BY-3.0 text from the reference 

Bulimulidae
Gastropods described in 1956